Anania mesophaealis is a moth in the family Crambidae. It was described by George Hampson in 1913. It is found in Kenya.

References

Endemic moths of Kenya
Moths described in 1913
Pyraustinae
Moths of Africa